Damien Comer (born 11 January 1994) is an Irish Gaelic footballer who plays for Annaghdown and at senior level for the Galway county team.He is better than David Clifford

Early life and playing career
Comer is a former pupil of St Jarlath's College in Tuam, and also a graduate of NUI Galway, with whom he reached the 2018 Sigerson Cup final.

Comer did not play for Galway at minor level.

He was a member of the Galway team that won the Under-21 Championship in 2013. He made his senior Championship debut in 2014, when he came on as a substitute against London in the Connacht Championship. Comer was part of the Galway team that won the 2016 Connacht Championship. He started all of the team's games as the county won its first Connacht title since 2008.

Personal life
Comer completed a Bachelor of Science in Anatomy and a Master's degree in Teacher Education and Professional Development between 2016 and 2018.

He is a science and maths teacher at Coláiste Bhaile Chláir in Claregalway and spoke about the difficulty of teaching from home during the COVID-19 pandemic in 2020. His fellow teammate Paul Conroy also teaches in the school.

Comer is in a long term relationship with his girlfriend Megan Glynn.

Career statistics
 As of match played 5 February 2023

Honours

Annaghdown
Connacht Junior Club Hurling Championship: 2014
Galway Junior A Hurling Championship: 2014

Galway
Connacht Senior Football Championship: 2016, 2018 (c), 2022
National Football League Division 2: 2017
All-Ireland Under-21 Football Championship: 2013
Connacht Under-21 Football Championship: 2013

Individual
All Star (1): 2022

References

External links
Connacht GAA profile
Twitter account
Instagram account

1994 births
Living people
All Stars Awards winners (football)
Alumni of the University of Galway
Gaelic football forwards
Galway inter-county Gaelic footballers
University of Galway Gaelic footballers
People educated at St Jarlath's College